Dorstenia nummularia is a plant species in the family Moraceae which is native to Cuba.

References

nummularia
Plants described in 1929
Flora of Cuba
Flora without expected TNC conservation status